Oscar Passet (born 12 October 1965) is a former Argentine footballer was a goalkeeper.

Honours

Club
River Plate
Argentine Primera División: 1989–90

San Lorenzo
Argentine Primera División: 1995 Clausura

References

External links
 

1965 births
Living people
Footballers from Santa Fe, Argentina
Argentine people of French descent
Argentine footballers
Association football goalkeepers
Argentine Primera División players
Unión de Santa Fe footballers
Club Atlético River Plate footballers
San Lorenzo de Almagro footballers
Club Atlético Independiente footballers
Newell's Old Boys footballers